Hypercompe leucarctioides is a moth of the family Erebidae first described by Augustus Radcliffe Grote and Coleman Townsend Robinson in 1867. It is found in Mexico and Guatemala.

References

Hypercompe
Moths described in 1867